Bettle or Bettles may refer to :

 Bettles, Alaska, in the United States

People
 Alison Bettles (born 1969), English television actress
 Artie Bettles (1891–1971), Australian footballer
 John Bettles (1907–1983), English lawn bowler
 Sarah Bettles (born 1992), British archer

Other
 Bettles Airport, airport in Beetles, Alaska
 Bettle Peak, peak in Antarctica
 Bettle Juice, 1988 American horror comedy film